Urbanna Historic District is a national historic district located at Urbanna, Middlesex County, Virginia. It encompasses 65 contributing buildings and 1 contributing site in the central business district and surrounding residential areas of Urbanna. Notable buildings include the Old Tavern, Gressitt House (c. 1820), Genders House (1876), Fitchett (1884), Van Wagenen House (c. 1900), C. H. Palmer Garage (c. 1930), Sentinel Building, Urbanna Town Office, Taylor Hardware (1921-1925), Bank of Middlesex (1900-1901), Urbanna Baptist Church (1896), Located in the district and separately listed are the Old Courthouse, Lansdowne, James Mills Storehouse, Sandwich, and Wormeley Cottage.

It was listed on the National Register of Historic Places in 1991.

References

Archaeological sites on the National Register of Historic Places in Virginia
Buildings and structures in Middlesex County, Virginia
National Register of Historic Places in Middlesex County, Virginia
Historic districts on the National Register of Historic Places in Virginia